The following highways have been numbered 924:

Canada

United States